In mathematics, a spherical coordinate system is a coordinate system for three-dimensional space where the position of a point is specified by three numbers: the radial distance of that point from a fixed origin, its polar angle measured from a fixed zenith direction, and the azimuthal angle of its orthogonal projection on a reference plane that passes through the origin and is orthogonal to the zenith, measured from a fixed reference direction on that plane. It can be seen as the three-dimensional version of the polar coordinate system. 

The radial distance is also called the radius or radial coordinate. The polar angle may be called colatitude, zenith angle, normal angle, or inclination angle.

When radius is fixed, the two angular coordinates make a coordinate system on the sphere sometimes called spherical polar coordinates.

The use of symbols and the order of the coordinates differs among sources and disciplines. This article will use the ISO convention frequently encountered in physics:  gives the radial distance, polar angle, and azimuthal angle. By contrast, in many mathematics books,  or  gives the radial distance, azimuthal angle, and polar angle, switching the meanings of θ and φ. Other conventions are also used, such as r for radius from the z-axis, so great care needs to be taken to check the meaning of the symbols. 

According to the conventions of geographical coordinate systems, positions are measured by latitude, longitude, and height (altitude). There are a number of celestial coordinate systems based on different fundamental planes and with different terms for the various coordinates. The spherical coordinate systems used in mathematics normally use radians rather than degrees and measure the azimuthal angle counterclockwise from the -axis to the -axis rather than clockwise from north (0°) to east (+90°) like the horizontal coordinate system. The polar angle is often replaced by the elevation angle measured from the reference plane towards the positive Z axis, so that the elevation angle of zero is at the horizon; the depression angle is the negative of the elevation angle.

The spherical coordinate system generalizes the two-dimensional polar coordinate system. It can also be extended to higher-dimensional spaces and is then referred to as a hyperspherical coordinate system.

Definition 
To define a spherical coordinate system, one must choose two orthogonal directions, the zenith and the azimuth reference, and an origin point in space. These choices determine a reference plane that contains the origin and is perpendicular to the zenith. The spherical coordinates of a point  are then defined as follows:

 The azimuth (or azimuthal angle) is the signed angle measured from the azimuth reference direction to the orthogonal projection of the line segment  on the reference plane.
 The inclination (or polar angle) is the angle between the zenith direction and the line segment .

The sign of the azimuth is determined by choosing what is a positive sense of turning about the zenith. This choice is arbitrary, and is part of the coordinate system's definition.

The elevation angle is the signed angle between the reference plane and the line segment , where positive angles are oriented towards the zenith. Equivalently, it is 90 degrees ( radians) minus the inclination angle.

If the inclination is zero or 180 degrees ( radians), the azimuth is arbitrary. If the radius is zero, both azimuth and inclination are arbitrary.

In linear algebra, the vector from the origin  to the point  is often called the position vector of P.

Conventions 
Several different conventions exist for representing the three coordinates, and for the order in which they should be written.

However, some authors (including mathematicians) use ρ for radial distance, φ for inclination (or elevation) and θ for azimuth, and r for radius from the z-axis, which "provides a logical extension of the usual polar coordinates notation". Some authors may also list the azimuth before the inclination (or elevation). Some combinations of these choices result in a left-handed coordinate system. The standard convention  conflicts with the usual notation for two-dimensional polar coordinates and three-dimensional cylindrical coordinates, where  is often used for the azimuth.

The angles are typically measured in degrees (°) or radians (rad), where 360° = 2 rad. Degrees are most common in geography, astronomy, and engineering, whereas radians are commonly used in mathematics and theoretical physics. The unit for radial distance is usually determined by the context.

When the system is used for physical three-space, it is customary to use positive sign for azimuth angles that are measured in the counter-clockwise sense from the reference direction on the reference plane, as seen from the zenith side of the plane. This convention is used, in particular, for geographical coordinates, where the "zenith" direction is north and positive azimuth (longitude) angles are measured eastwards from some prime meridian.

{| class="wikitable" style="text-align:center"
|+ Major conventions
|-
! coordinates !! corresponding local geographical directions   !! right/left-handed
|-
|  ||  || right
|-
| ||  || right
|-
| ||  || left
|}
Note: easting, northing, upwardness.

Unique coordinates 
Any spherical coordinate triplet  specifies a single point of three-dimensional space. On the other hand, every point has infinitely many equivalent spherical coordinates. One can add or subtract any number of full turns to either angular measure without changing the angles themselves, and therefore without changing the point.

If it is necessary to define a unique set of spherical coordinates for each point, one must restrict their ranges. A common choice is

 
 
 

This is the standard convention for geographic longitude.

In geography, the latitude is the elevation.

Even with these restrictions, if  is 0° or 180° (elevation is 90° or −90°) then the azimuth angle is arbitrary; and if  is zero, both azimuth and inclination/elevation are arbitrary. To make the coordinates unique, one can use the convention that in these cases the arbitrary coordinates are zero.

Plotting 
To plot a dot from its spherical coordinates , where  is inclination, move  units from the origin in the zenith direction, rotate by  about the origin towards the azimuth reference direction, and rotate by  about the zenith in the proper direction.

Applications 
Just as the two-dimensional Cartesian coordinate system is useful on the plane, a two-dimensional spherical coordinate system is useful on the surface of a sphere. In this system, the sphere is taken as a unit sphere, so the radius is unity and can generally be ignored. This simplification can also be very useful when dealing with objects such as rotational matrices.

Spherical coordinates are useful in analyzing systems that have some degree of symmetry about a point, such as volume integrals inside a sphere, the potential energy field surrounding a concentrated mass or charge, or global weather simulation in a planet's atmosphere. A sphere that has the Cartesian equation  has the simple equation  in spherical coordinates.

Two important partial differential equations that arise in many physical problems, Laplace's equation and the Helmholtz equation, allow a separation of variables in spherical coordinates. The angular portions of the solutions to such equations take the form of spherical harmonics.

Another application is ergonomic design, where  is the arm length of a stationary person and the angles describe the direction of the arm as it reaches out.

Three dimensional modeling of loudspeaker output patterns can be used to predict their performance. A number of polar plots are required, taken at a wide selection of frequencies, as the pattern changes greatly with frequency. Polar plots help to show that many loudspeakers tend toward omnidirectionality at lower frequencies.

The spherical coordinate system is also commonly used in 3D game development to rotate the camera around the player's position

In geography 

To a first approximation, the geographic coordinate system uses elevation angle (latitude) in degrees north of the equator plane, in the range , instead of inclination.
The polar angle, which is 90° minus the latitude and ranges from 0 to 180°, is called colatitude in geography.

For positions on the Earth or other solid celestial body, the reference plane is usually taken to be the plane perpendicular to the axis of rotation. 

Instead of the radial distance, geographers commonly use altitude above or below some reference surface (vertical datum), which may be the mean sea level.

However, modern geographical coordinate systems are quite complex, and the positions implied by these simple formulae may be wrong by several kilometers. The precise standard meanings of latitude, longitude and altitude are currently defined by the World Geodetic System (WGS), and take into account the flattening of the Earth at the poles (about ) and many other details.

Planetary coordinate systems use formulations analogous to the geographic coordinate system.

In astronomy 
A series of astronomical coordinate systems are used to measure the elevation angle from different fundamental planes. These reference planes are the observer's horizon, the celestial equator (defined by Earth's rotation), the plane of the ecliptic (defined by Earth's orbit around the Sun), the plane of the earth terminator (normal to the instantaneous direction to the Sun), and the galactic equator (defined by the rotation of the Milky Way).

Coordinate system conversions 

As the spherical coordinate system is only one of many three-dimensional coordinate systems, there exist equations for converting coordinates between the spherical coordinate system and others.

Cartesian coordinates 
The spherical coordinates of a point in the ISO convention (i.e. for physics:  radius  ,  inclination  ,  azimuth  ) can be obtained from its Cartesian coordinates  by the formulae

 

See the article on atan2.

These formulae assume that the two systems have the same origin, that the spherical reference plane is the Cartesian  plane, that  is inclination from the  direction, and that the azimuth angles are measured from the Cartesian  axis (so that the  axis has ).

Cylindrical coordinates 

Cylindrical coordinates (axial radius ρ, azimuth  φ, elevation z) may be converted into spherical coordinates (central radius r, inclination θ, azimuth φ), by the formulas

 

Conversely, the spherical coordinates may be converted into cylindrical coordinates by the formulae

 

These formulae assume that the two systems have the same origin and same reference plane, measure the azimuth angle  in the same senses from the same axis, and that the spherical angle  is inclination from the cylindrical  axis.

Generalization 

It is also possible to deal with ellipsoids in Cartesian coordinates by using a modified version of the spherical coordinates. 

Let P be an ellipsoid specified by the level set

 

The modified spherical coordinates of a point in P in the ISO convention (i.e. for physics: radius , inclination , azimuth ) can be obtained from its Cartesian coordinates  by the formulae

 

An infinitesimal volume element is given by

 

The square-root factor comes from the property of the determinant that allows a constant to be pulled out from a column:

Integration and differentiation in spherical coordinates 

where

The linear transformation  to this right-handed coordinate triplet  is a rotation matrix,

This gives the transformation from the spherical to the cartesian, the other way around is given by its inverse.
Note: the matrix is an orthogonal matrix, that is, its inverse is simply its transpose.

The Cartesian unit vectors are thus related to the spherical unit vectors by:

The general form of the formula to prove the differential line element, is

To apply this to the present case, one needs to calculate how  changes with each of the coordinates. In the conventions used, 

Thus,

The desired coefficients are the magnitudes of these vectors:

Thus the differential solid angle is

The surface element in a surface of polar angle  constant (a cone with vertex the origin) is

The surface element in a surface of azimuth  constant (a vertical half-plane) is

namely 

The del operator in this system leads to the following expressions for the gradient, divergence, curl and (scalar) Laplacian,

Further,  the inverse Jacobian in Cartesian coordinates is

Distance in spherical coordinates 
In spherical coordinates, given two points with  being the azimuthal coordinate

The distance between the two points can be expressed as

Kinematics 
In spherical coordinates, the position of a point or particle (although better written as a triple) can be written as
 
Its velocity is then
 
and its acceleration is
 

The  angular momentum is 
 
Where  is mass. In the case of a constant  or else , this reduces to vector calculus in polar coordinates.

The corresponding  angular momentum operator then follows from the phase-space reformulation of the above,  

The torque is given as
 

The kinetic energy is given as

See also

Notes

Bibliography

External links 
 
 MathWorld description of spherical coordinates
 Coordinate Converter — converts between polar, Cartesian and spherical coordinates
 

Three-dimensional coordinate systems
Orthogonal coordinate systems

fi:Koordinaatisto#Pallokoordinaatisto